"Tailgate to Heaven" is a song by Canadian country artist Shawn Austin featuring American country artist Chris Lane. The song was written by Kelly Archer, Rodney Clawson, and Will Bundy, while Bundy produced the track with Scott Cooke. It marked the debut release from Local Hay Records, a joint venture between Big Loud, Dallas Smith, and their partners.

Background
Austin and Lane were initially going to do a different song together, but once Lane heard "Tailgate to Heaven", he wanted to be a part of it and Austin said yes "without hesitation". He remarked that he was "humbled" to have Lane on the track.

Critical reception
Nanci Dagg of Canadian Beats Media called the song a "beautiful ballad". Jenna Weishar of Front Porch Music stated the song had a "rock-country flare", noting Austin's "smooth vocals" and adding that Chris Lane was a "perfect match for the duet" as their voices "elevate each other". Will Chernoff of Rhythm Changes said "Tailgate to Heaven" was "more interesting" than Austin's previous radio singles.

Accolades

Commercial performance
"Tailgate to Heaven" reached a peak of number five on the Billboard Canada Country chart, surpassing Austin's previous career high of seven set by "What Do I Know" in 2019. It also peaked at number 61 on the Canadian Hot 100, becoming Austin's first career entry on his national all-genre chart and Lane's career highest charting entry there as well.

Music video
The official music video for "Tailgate to Heaven" features both Austin and Lane and premiered on November 4, 2021. It was filmed in Tennessee and directed by Justin Clough.

Charts

References

2021 songs
2021 singles
Shawn Austin songs
Chris Lane songs
Big Loud singles
Songs written by Kelly Archer
Songs written by Rodney Clawson